Adam Seymour is an English guitarist and songwriter who began his recording career with the Katydids, a south London quintet that recorded two albums before disbanding.

He met Katydids' singer Susie Hug in 1987 when both were playing on sessions for Big Bam Boo. Developing an instant rapport the duo formed a band recruiting other members Dan James (guitar), Dave Hunter (bass) and Shane Young (drummer). Seymour and Hug wrote the material for the band.

After Reprise Records dropped the Katydids, Seymour joined The Pretenders for four albums: Last of the Independents, the live album The Isle of View, Viva el Amor and Loose Screw.

Additional performances featuring Seymour appeared on the four-disc Rhino Records release Pirate Radio which chronicled the band's career. Seymour contributed as a songwriter to The Pretenders' output, the first time that a band member (outside of the original members James Honeyman-Scott and Pete Farndon) had been allowed to do so. Seymour played with the band from 1993 through 2007.

References
Footnotes

Sources
 Pretenders Archives
 Pretenders 977 Radio

Living people
Year of birth missing (living people)
English rock guitarists
English songwriters
The Pretenders members